Glycoprotein hormone beta-5 is a protein that in humans is encoded by the GPHB5 gene.

GPHB5 is a cystine knot-forming polypeptide and a subunit of the dimeric glycoprotein hormone family (Hsu et al., 2002).[supplied by OMIM]

References

Further reading

Human proteins